Woody's may refer to:

 Woody's Chicago Style, an American fast food chain.
 Woody's Bar-B-Q, a Florida-based restaurant with 34 restaurants on the Eastern portion of the United States.
 Woody's (Toronto), one of the world's most famous gay bars, in Toronto, Ontario.

See also

 Woodie's DIY, a DIY store chain operated by the Grafton Group
 
 Woody (disambiguation)
 Woodies (disambiguation)
 Woods (disambiguation)